Live at the Velvet Lounge is an album by American jazz saxophonist Fred Anderson with German free jazz bassist Peter Kowald and long-time collaborator drummer Hamid Drake. The record documents a June 1998 performance at the Chicago club owned by Anderson, the Velvet Lounge, and was released on the Okka Disk label.

Reception

In her review for AllMusic, Joslyn Layne states "Before you know it, the trio is in the midst of a lively musical display that melds Anderson's all-out blowing, Kowald's extended techniques, and Drake's skill in hand percussion."
The Penguin Guide to Jazz states "The live session comes from Anderson's own club and it has the self-indulgent relaxation of focus that comes with a home gig."

Track listing
All compositions by Fred Anderson, Peter Kowald, Hamid Drake
 "Straight, but not Straight" - 33:17
 "To Those Who Know" - 11:41
 "Multidimensional Reality" - 28:54

Personnel
Fred Anderson - tenor sax
Peter Kowald - bass
Hamid Drake - percussion

References

1999 live albums
Fred Anderson (musician) live albums
Okka Disk live albums